Chionodes argentipunctella is a moth in the family Gelechiidae. It is found in North America, where it has been recorded from Vermont, south-eastern Ontario, New Jersey, Illinois and Connecticut.

The wingspan is about 17 mm. The forewings are very dark purplish with a white spot on the costa at the apical third, shaded with black anteriorly. There are two black discal spots shaded with white near the middle of the wing and a similar one on the fold, below the first and nearer the base. The hindwings are yellowish.

The larvae feed on Alnus species and Corylus americana.

References

Chionodes
Moths described in 1910
Moths of North America